Osteocephalus buckleyi, also known as Buckley's slender-legged treefrog,  is a species of frog in the family Hylidae. It is found along the periphery of the Amazon Basin in Bolivia, Peru, Ecuador, Colombia, northeastern Brazil, Venezuela, Guyana, Suriname, and French Guiana, and also in the Orinoco Delta in Venezuela. It is probably a species complex. Some sources treat Osteocephalus vilmae from Ecuador and Peru as a valid species.

Etymology
The specific name buckleyi honours Clarence Buckley, a collector active in Ecuador in 1880s and who collected the type series.

Description
Males measure  and females  in snout–vent length. The dorsum is pale green with dark blotches. A yellow or coffee colored medial vertebral stripe might be present. The flanks vary from cream to light brown with darker spots that can approach black. In males, the dorsal skin has a mixture of small and large tubercles with keratinized points, whereas in adult females the dorsal tubercles are very dispersed. The head is almost as long as wide; the snout is truncated. The finger disks are expanded.

Habitat and conservation
Natural habitats of Osteocephalus buckleyi are old and second growth rainforests and forest edges. Reproduction takes place in narrow permanent waterbodies (streams and igarapés). It can locally be threatened by habitat loss.

References

buckleyi
Amphibians of Bolivia
Amphibians of Brazil
Amphibians of Colombia
Amphibians of Ecuador
Amphibians of French Guiana
Amphibians of Guyana
Amphibians of Peru
Amphibians of Suriname
Amphibians of Venezuela
Amphibians described in 1882
Taxa named by George Albert Boulenger
Taxonomy articles created by Polbot